Lateef at Cranbrook (also reissued as Yusef Lateef) is a live album by multi-instrumentalist Yusef Lateef recorded in 1958 at the Cranbrook Academy of Art and released on the Argo label.

Reception

The Allmusic site awarded the album 3 stars.

Track listing 
All compositions by Yusef Lateef except as indicated
 "Morning" - 15:05
 "Brazil" (Ary Barroso) - 2:54
 "Let Every Soul Say Amen" - 3:57
 "Woody N' You" (Dizzy Gillespie) - 14:42

Personnel 
Yusef Lateef - tenor saxophone, flute, oboe, argol, percussion
Frank Morelli - baritone saxophone
Terry Pollard - piano
William Austin - bass, rabat
Frank Gant - drums, gong, finger cymbals

References 

Yusef Lateef live albums
1958 live albums
Argo Records live albums